William Michael Schultz (December 17, 1920 – August 2, 2004) was a professional baseball player.  He was a left-handed pitcher for one season (1947) with the Cincinnati Reds.  For his career, he did not record a decision, with a 4.50 earned run average in two innings pitched.

He was born in Syracuse, New York and died in East Syracuse, New York at the age of 83.

External links

1920 births
2004 deaths
Cincinnati Reds players
Major League Baseball pitchers
Baseball players from Syracuse, New York
Syracuse Chiefs players
Birmingham Barons players
Tulsa Oilers (baseball) players
Rochester Red Wings players
Buffalo Bisons (minor league) players
People from DeWitt, New York